Acinetactis is a possible genus of protist first described in 1886 by A.C. Stokes, who also described the type species A. mirabilis. In 1928, Valkanov reported the discovery of a second species, A. arnaudovii. The most recently recorded specimen of A. mirabilis was reported in 1940, no Acinetactis specimens have been reported since. 

The validity and classification of this genus is contested. In 1914, Adolf Pascher cast doubt on Acinetactis, suggesting that it was a junior synonym of Dimorpha mutans. Cavalier-Smith classified Acinetactis as a heliomonad in 1993. Bass et al. suggested in 2009 that the genus was a cercozoan in the class Granofilosea.

References

Cercozoa